John Neil Sherwood  (c. 1933 – 4 December 2020) was a British physical chemist, who researched organic crystals. He spent his career at the University of Strathclyde, where he was professor of chemistry (1977–2002), as well as serving as vice-principal (from 1994).

Career and research
Sherwood was born in Redruth, Cornwall, to Lily (née Rose) and William Sherwood, who taught French. He was educated at Aireborough Grammar School, near Bradford, and from 1951 studied chemistry at the University of Durham, where he gained BSc (1955), PhD (1960) and DSc (1976) degrees. His DSc thesis was entitled "Studies of the solid state".

In 1960, he joined the Royal College of Science and Technology in Glasgow – from 1964, part of the University of Strathclyde – where he was lecturer and then professor of chemistry (from 1977). He served as dean of the faculty of science, and the university's deputy principal and vice-principal (from 1994). He retired in 2002, remaining an emeritus professor in pure and applied chemistry until his death.

His research was into organic crystals, particularly their growth and the effects of imperfections. He grew large high-purity crystals of various compounds, and established a research centre at Strathclyde, the first to research growth of organic crystals. Some of his research had industrial applications, including preventing fuels from crystallising at low temperatures, ensuring the safety of explosives, and researching novel fibre-optics for use in communications.

Sherwood chaired the British Association for Crystal Growth. He was elected fellow of the Royal Society of Edinburgh in 1975, and was also a fellow of the Royal Society of Chemistry.

Personal life
In 1958, he married Margaret Shaw (died 2020); they had two daughters. He died on 4 December 2020, at the age of 87.

Selected publications
Books

Source:
David Pugh, Kevin J. Roberts, John N. Sherwood (eds). Crystal Growth of Organic Materials (Institute of Physics, 1993)
John N. Sherwood (ed.). Structure of Surfaces and Interfaces as Studied Using Synchrotron Radiation (Royal Society of Chemistry; 1990)
John N. Sherwood (ed.). The Plastically Crystalline State: Orientationally-disordered Crystals (J. Wiley & Sons; 1979)
John Neil Sherwood (ed.). Diffusion processes: Proceedings of the Thomas Graham Memorial Symposium, University of Strathclyde (Gordon and Breach; 1971)
George Murray Burnett, John Neil Sherwood, Alastair M. North (eds). Transfer and Storage of Energy by Molecules Volume 4 (Wiley-Interscience; 1969)

Research articles

References

External links
Profile at University of Strathclyde

Year of birth uncertain
2020 deaths
People from Redruth
People educated at Aireborough Grammar School
Academics of the University of Strathclyde
British physical chemists
20th-century British chemists
Alumni of the College of the Venerable Bede, Durham